Woman Gives Birth To Tomato! is the twenty-fourth studio album by Omar Rodríguez-López, released under the name Omar Rodriguez-Lopez Group. 
Although Rodriguez-Lopez Productions intended to release the album on December 28, 2012 (which is the date listed on the Bandcamp page), it was only made available on January 1, 2013, less than 2 hours after the release of Equinox.  Since Omar Rodriguez Lopez's recent efforts were focused on his newly formed band, Bosnian Rainbows, this album was not as anticipated as it had been in 2011, when the album cover art had first appeared in the booklet for Rodriguez-Lopez's compilation album, Telesterion.

Since 2014 the album is no longer available to purchase officially, as Rodriguez-Lopez's Bandcamp page has been taken down after a split with Sargent House label.

Track listing

All of the tracks on the album are named after a city in which Rodriguez-Lopez lived at some point of his life, except "Tokyo Japan" (which consists entirely of silence).

 "Bayamón, Puerto Rico" – 4:09
 "Puebla, México" – 2:09
 "El Paso, Texas" – 15:28
 "Long Beach, California" – 3:40
 "Amsterdam, Holland" – 6:58
 "Brooklyn, New York" – 2:39
 "Zapopan, México" – 9:25
 "Tokyo, Japan" – 0:30

Personnel

Omar Rodríguez-López – synthesizers, sequences, piano, guitar, production
Adrián Terrazas-González – saxophone, bass clarinet, flute
Aaron Cruz Bravo – double bass
Mark Aanderud – piano
Hernan Hecht – drums

Production
 Lars Stalfors – mixing
 Pete Lyman – mastering
 Sonny Kay – artwork and layout

Release history

References

2013 albums
Omar Rodríguez-López albums
Albums produced by Omar Rodríguez-López